Volkmar is both a given name and a surname. Notable people with the name include:

Given name
Volkmar Andreae (1879–1962), Swiss conductor and composer
Volkmar Leimert (born 1940), German composer and dramaturg
Volkmar Sigusch (born 1940), German physician and sociologist
Volkmar Weiss (born 1944), German scientist and writer
Volkmar Wentzel (1915–2006), German-born American photographer
Volkmar Würtz (born 1938), German fencer

Surname
Fred R. Volkmar, American psychiatrist
Theodor Valentin Volkmar (1781–1847), German jurist and politician

Fictional characters
Volkmar the Grim, a character in the tabletop game of Warhammer
Count Volkmar of Gretz, a line of heritage in James A. Michener's The Source

See also
Volkmer
Volckmar

German masculine given names